Dunavecse is a town and municipality in Bács-Kiskun County in southern Hungary.

Croats in Hungary call this town Večica.

References

External links

  in Hungarian

Populated places in Bács-Kiskun County
Towns in Hungary
Populated places on the Danube